Cliff Kapono is a Native Hawaiian professional surfer, journalist, and marine conservation scientist. He is known for his research that combines his interests.

Education 
Kapono earned his PhD at the University of California, San Diego at the Skaggs School of Pharmacy.

Career
As a surfer, a scientist, and a Native Hawaiian, Kapono's work focuses on ocean conservation and sustainability. He says that research is part of both his career and his identity. “Science is very powerful in that way to me, as an indigenous person, because it can help to communicate an idea that we have spent thousands of years trying to formulate...For me, the two spaces are completely connected, completely intertwined," he told The Surfer's Journal. Kapono says that surfing has been in his family for 90 generations. 

One of his best-known projects is the Surfer Biome Project, where he studied the microbiome of surfers around the world. Kapono currently studies coral health at the University of Hawaiʻi at Hilo. 

Kapono is an ambassador for the Save the Waves Coalition and several other ocean conservation non-profit organizations, as well as for-profit surfing brands. He has been profiled in several surfing outlets, including Surfer Magazine and The Surfer's Journal. Kapono also has a YouTube channel, where he posts videos about scientists and surfers alike.

In 2019, he was featured in a national commercial advertising Hawaii as a travel destination.

Selected honors and awards
Native Hawaiian Scholar, University of Hawaii at Manoa
ChangeMaker, University of California, San Diego, 2018
Wave Saver of the Year, Save the Waves Coalition, 2018
John Kelly Awards (Surfer/Waterperson), Surfrider O'ahu, 2018
Featured Speaker, Society for the Advancement of Chicanos/Hispanics and Native Americans in Science, 2019
Island Ambassador, 2019

References

Year of birth missing (living people)
Living people
American surfers
Native Hawaiian activists
Native Hawaiian sportspeople
University of California, San Diego alumni
University of Hawaiʻi at Hilo alumni
American YouTubers